José Joaquín Fabregat (1748 in Torreblanca – 1807 in Mexico) was an engraver and cartoonist of the New Spain who was born in Torreblanca, in the province of Castelló, and  began his studies in the Academy of San Carlos.

Artistic career 
José Joaquín Fabregat began his studies at the Academy of San Carlos. In 1772 he obtained an engraving prize at the Academy of San Fernando,   and in 1774 he obtain the title of  Supernumerary  Professor at the same institution,.  He also won  the   Merit Prize of the Academy of San Carlos in 1781. In 1788 he travelled  to Mexico after being appointed Engrave Director of the Academy of Fine Arts of San Carlos in Mexico.

Fabregat created engravings for some of the most recognised printers of the period: Antonio Sancha, Joaquín Ibarra, the Real Printing in Madrid, and Benito Monfort from Valencia.

Work

Graphic work at the University of Navarra 
 Arman a Sancho para defender la ínsula acometida por los enemigos
 Battle of Don Quixote with the knight of the Mirrors
 Despedida de Sancho del ama y de la sobrina 
 Disputa de Sancho con la sobrina y el ama 
 Don Quijote enjaulado es sacado de la venta 
 Don Quijote hace penitencia en Sierra Morena 
 Don Quijote impone sus condiciones al Caballero del Bosque tras derrotarle 
 Baby Jesus
 Portrait of Carlos Antonio Erra (1774)
 Portrait of Carlos IV, King of Spain
 Portrait of Francisco of Rioja
 Portrait of Juan Bautista Pérez
 Portrait of Juan Luis Vives
 Portrait of Juan María Rivera Valenzuela Pizarro
 Portrait of Lorenzo Bert
 Portrait of Lucio Anneo Séneca
 Portrait of Luis Antonio Bermejo (1769)
 Portrait of San Juan de Ribera

References 

1748 births
1807 deaths
Mexican engravers
Spanish engravers
Academy of San Carlos alumni